Language policy is an interdisciplinary academic field. Some scholars such as Joshua Fishman and Ofelia García consider it as part of sociolinguistics. On the other hand, other scholars such as Bernard Spolsky, Robert B. Kaplan and Joseph Lo Bianco argue that language policy is a branch of applied linguistics.

As a field, language policy used to be known as language planning and is related to other fields such as language ideology, language revitalization, language education, among others.

Definitions 
Language policy has been defined in a number of ways. According to Kaplan and Baldauf (1997), "A language policy is a body of ideas, laws, regulations, rules and practices intended to achieve the planned language change in the societies, group or system" (p. xi). 
Lo Bianco defines the field as "a situated activity, whose specific history and local circumstances influence what is regarded as a language problem, and whose political dynamics determine which language problems are given policy treatment” (p. 152).
McCarty (2011) defines language policy as "a complex sociocultural process [and as] modes of human interaction, negotiation, and production mediated by relations of power. The 'policy' in these processes resides in their language-regulating power; that is, the ways in which they express normative claims about legitimate and illegitimate language forms and uses, thereby governing language statuses and uses" (p. 8).

Overview 
Language policy is broad, but it can be categorized into three components. Spolsky (2004) argues, "A useful first step is to distinguish between the three components of the language policy of a speech community: (1) its language practices – the habitual pattern of selecting among the varieties that make up its linguistic repertoire; (2) its language beliefs or ideology – the beliefs about language and language use; and (3) any specific efforts to modify or influence that practice by any kind of language intervention, planning, or management" (p. 5).

The traditional scope of language policy concerns language regulation. This refers to what a government does either officially through legislation, court decisions or policy to determine how languages are used, cultivate language skills needed to meet national priorities or to establish the rights of individuals or groups to use and maintain languages.

Implementation 
 
The implementation of language policy varies from one State to another. This may be explained by the fact that language policy is often based on contingent historical reasons. Likewise, States also differ as to the degree of explicitness with which they implement a given language policy. The French Toubon law is a good example of explicit language policy. The same may be said for the Charter of the French Language in Quebec.

Scholars such as Tollefson argue that language policy can create inequality, "language planning-policy means the institutionalization of language as a basis for distinctions among social groups (classes). That is, language policy is one mechanism for locating language within social structure so that language determines who has access to political power and economic resources. Language policy is one mechanism by which dominant groups establish hegemony in language use" (p. 16).

Many countries have a language policy designed to favor or discourage the use of a particular language or set of languages. Although nations historically have used language policies most often to promote one official language at the expense of others, many countries now have policies designed to protect and promote regional and ethnic languages whose viability is threatened. Indeed, whilst the existence of linguistic minorities within their jurisdiction has often been considered to be a potential threat to internal cohesion, States also understand that providing language rights to minorities may be more in their long term interest, as a means of gaining citizens' trust in the central government.

The preservation of cultural and linguistic diversity in today's world is a major concern to many scientists, artists, writers, politicians, leaders of linguistic communities, and defenders of linguistic human rights. More than half of the 6000 languages currently spoken in the world are estimated to be in danger of disappearing during the 21st century. Many factors affect the existence and usage of any given human language, including the size of the native speaking population, its use in formal communication, and the geographical dispersion and the socio-economic weight of its speakers. National language policies can either mitigate or exacerbate the effects of some of these factors.

For example, according to Ghil'ad Zuckermann, "Native tongue title and language rights should be promoted. The government ought to define Aboriginal and Torres Strait Islander vernaculars as official languages of Australia. We must change the linguistic landscape of Whyalla and elsewhere. Signs should be in both English and the local indigenous language. We ought to acknowledge intellectual property of indigenous knowledge including language, music and dance."

There are many ways in which language policies can be categorized. It was elaborated by Université Laval sociolinguist Jacques Leclerc for the French-language Web site  put on line by the CIRAL in 1999. I to VI) at Presses de l'Université Laval in 1994. The work, containing some 470 language laws, and the research leading to publication, were subsidised by the Office québécois de la langue française. In April 2008, the Web site presented the linguistic portrait and language policies in 354 States or autonomous territories in 194 recognised countries.

Language regulators 
List of language regulators
Académie française
The Academy of the Hebrew Language
Accademia della Crusca
Akademio de Esperanto
Association of Spanish Language Academies
Board for Standardization of the Serbian Language (Serbia, Montenegro, Republika Srpska)
Bòrd na Gàidhlig (Gaelic in Scotland)
Commission on the Filipino Language (Philippines)
Dewan Bahasa dan Pustaka (Malaysia)
Dutch Language Union
Foras na Gaeilge (Irish)
Institut d'Estudis Catalans
Badan Pengembangan Bahasa dan Perbukuan (Indonesia)
Norwegian Language Council
Office québécois de la langue française
Ofis Publik ar Brezhoneg (Breton in Brittany)
Pan South African Language Board
Real Academia Española
Swedish Language Council
Welsh Language Commissioner

See also 
Linguistic diversity
Linguistic rights
Cultural hegemony
Directorate of Language Planning and Implementation
Economics of language
Grimm's law
Language change
Language movement
Language planning
Language politics
Language reform
Language revitalization
Language tax
Language death
Cross-border language
National language
Native Tongue Title
Official language
Official script
Regional language
Street name controversy
International Mother Language Day
International Year of Languages (2008)
 Languages in censuses
Directions of language policies:

 Linguistic imperialism
 Linguistic purism
 Language secessionism

Some case studies:
 Europe: European Charter for Regional or Minority Languages
 Belgium: Language legislation in Belgium
 Croatia: Croatian linguistic purism
 Finland: Finland's language strife
 France: Language policy in France
 Germany: Germanization
 Hungary: Magyarization
Italy: Italianization
 Latvia: Language policy in Latvia
 Poland: Polonization
 Russia and Soviet Union: Russification, Education in the Soviet Union
 Slovakia: Language law of Slovakia, Slovakization
 Spain: Language policies of Francoist Spain
 Ukraine: Ukrainization
 Wales: Welsh Not
 Arab world: Arabization
 Bangladesh: Bengali language movement
 Canada: Official bilingualism in Canada, Official Languages Act (Canada)
 India: Anti-Hindi agitations of Tamil Nadu
 Pakistan: Urdu movement
 United States: English-only movement

References

Bibliography 
 Tollefson, J. W. (1991). Planning language, planning inequality: Language policy in the community. London: Longman.
 Spolsky, B. (2004). Language policy. Cambridge: Cambridge University Press.
 Spolsky, B. (2009). Language management. Cambridge: Cambridge University Press.
 Johnson, D. C. (2013). Language policy. London: Palgrave MacMillan. 
 Cooper, R. L. (1989). Language planning and social change. Cambridge: Cambridge University Press.
 Zein, S. (2020). Language policy in superdiverse Indonesia. New York and London: Routledge. 
 Ginsburgh, V., Weber, S. (Eds.). (2016). The Palgrave Handbook of Economics and Language. London: Palgrave Macmillan. 
Michele Gazzola,Torsten Templin, Bengt-Arne Wickström, (2018), Language Policy and Linguistic Justice, Springer.
Shohamy, Elana (2006). Language Policy: Hidden Agendas and New Approaches. London: Routledge.
 Hult, F.M., & Johnson, D.C. (Eds.) (2015). Research Methods in Language Policy and Planning: A Practical Guide. Malden, MA: Wiley-Blackwell .
 Crawford, James (2000). Language Policy Website.
 Bastardas-Boada, Albert (2012). Language and identity policies in the 'glocal' age. Barcelona: Institut d'Estudis Autonòmics.
 Bastardas-Boada, Albert (2013). Language policy and planning as an interdisciplinary field: Towards a complexity approach,  Current Issues in Language Planning, Volume 14, 2013 - Issue 3-04.
Bastardas-Boada, Albert (2019). From language shift to language revitalization and sustainability. A complexity approach to linguistic ecology. Barcelona: Edicions de la Universitat de Barcelona. .
Kadochnikov, D. (2016). Languages, Regional Conflicts and Economic Development: Russia.  In: Ginsburgh, V., Weber, S. (Eds.). The Palgrave Handbook of Economics and Language. London: Palgrave Macmillan. 2016. pp. 538–580.
 Spolsky, Bernard (2012). The Cambridge Handbook of Language Policy. Cambridge University Press. 
Silva, Diego B. (2019). Language policy in Oceania. Alfa, Rev. Linguíst. 63 (2). 
 Zuckermann, Ghil'ad and Walsh, Michael 2011.'Stop, Revive, Survive: Lessons from the Hebrew Revival Applicable to the Reclamation, Maintenance and Empowerment of Aboriginal Languages and Cultures', Australian Journal of Linguistics 31.

External links 
Language Policy Division of the Council of Europe